Proterodesma turbotti is a species of moth in the family Tineidae. It was described by John Salmon & John David Bradley in 1956. This species is endemic to New Zealand.

References

Moths described in 1956
Tineidae
Moths of New Zealand
Endemic fauna of New Zealand
Endemic moths of New Zealand